Kūdra is a residential area and neighbourhood of the city Jūrmala, Latvia.

The Kūdra railway station was established in 1951.

References

External links 

Neighbourhoods in Jūrmala